Hochstein may refer to:

Hochstein (surname)
Hochstein (Arnbruck), a mountain of Bavaria, Germany
Hochstein (Eifel), a volcanic conic in Rhineland-Palatinate, Germany
Hochstein (Elstra), a mountain of Saxony, Germany
Hochstein (Lawalde), a mountain of Saxony, Germany
Hochstein (rocks), a rock formation in Rhineland-Palatinate, Germany
Hochstein Ridge, a ridge of Antarctica
Hochstein School of Music & Dance in Rochester, New York